Stanley R. Graham (born November 26, 1926) is an American psychologist and a past president of the American Psychological Association.

Biography
Graham served as president of the APA in 1990. While serving as president, Graham felt that psychology education needed to shift some of its focus from long-term psychotherapy to resources that would assist clients to combat social ills. He later received the APA Award for Distinguished Professional Contributions.

References

1926 births
Presidents of the American Psychological Association
Living people